Tom Wall (30 May 1941 – 5 October 1992) was a British landscape painter and educator.

Biography
Born in Balham, London, he moved with his family to Bryhonddu in Wales at the age of 10, later studying at Newport College of Art and the Slade School of Fine Art in London. It is believed that the countryside around Abergavenny inspired his enduring relationship with art and landscape.

Wall spent most of his teaching career at Cleveland College of Art and Design, arriving in 1968 and staying for 23 years, ending up as principal lecturer for art. He retired in August 1991 to devote the rest of his life to his beloved art.

He was described as a "painter of great talent with a remarkable personal vision" by Kenneth Clark, who also said he was "a natural painter who is also a poet".
 
The major body of his work was entitled "Visionary Landscapes" and he was highlighted as "a true artist on the verge, perhaps of visions so transitive that they become revelations" by the Yorkshire Post. He also produced other series such as "Journey Paintings", "Symphony in Colour" and "Fantasy Landscapes".
His 1985 exhibition at the Warminster Arts Centre (organised by a former pupil-John Henshaw- https://sites.google.com/a/henshaworks.com/www/biography) generated so much interest that it was nearly a sell-out.Indeed one of his largest works in that exhibition (6' x 4')was sold to the local Warminster Hospital where it still hangs for all to appreciate.

Wall's last exhibition was held jointly with a former pupil of Cleveland College of Art and Design, Mackenzie Thorpe at St. Martin in the Fields Gallery, London, 28 June – 11 July 1992. Thorpe later said of Wall, "His style (of working) made a great impression on me and was the beginning of what I have gone on to do."

Exhibitions 
Sources: 
 Welsh Arts Council Annual Exhibitions – 1959, 1960, 1961, 1962, 1964
 South Wales Group – 1959, 1960, 1961
 Leicester Galleries, London – Selected work from the South Wales Group – 1961
 Group Show, Cardiff −1964
 Amolfini Gallery, Bristol – Joint One-Man Show, January – February 1966
 Spring Exhibition Contemporary British Art, Bradford – 1966, 1967
 Winter Exhibition, Ferens Art Gallery, Hull – 1970, 1971
 Welsh Arts Council/South Wales Group, "NOW" Exhibition – 1971
 Teesside College of Art – December 1973
 Chapter Centre for the Arts, Cardiff – October 1974
 Mall Galleries, London – August 1975
 Response Exhibition, 13 Cleveland Artists, Billingham – 1976
 Preston Polytechnic Gallery, Lancaster – April to May 1977
 Sheffield University – July 1978
 Welsh National Eisteddfod – 1980
 Cleveland College of Art – June 1982
 Byre Gallery, Glaisdale – July 1982
 'Work', Five Artists, Jarrow – 1983
 Hartlepool Art Gallery – 1984
 Warminster Art Centre, Wiltshire – October 1985
 Chandler Gallery, Leyburn – 1990
 John Laing Exhibition, Harrogate – 1992
 St. Martin in the Fields Gallery, London – 1992
 Tennants Gallery, Leyburn – 1993 (posthumously)
 Rennie Hamilton Gallery, Barnard Castle – 2008 (posthumously)

References

External links 
 Tom Wall tribute site
 Tom Wall Giclèe Collection
 Original Tom Wall

Landscape artists
1941 births
1992 deaths
English artists
Alumni of the Slade School of Fine Art